Rachael Karker (born September 9, 1997) is a Canadian freestyle skier.

Career
Karker competed at the FIS Freestyle Ski and Snowboarding World Championships 2019, where she placed fourth in the halfpipe. 

She placed second at the 2018–19 and 2019–20 FIS World Cup standings and won silver at the FIS Freestyle Ski and Snowboarding World Championships 2021 in the halfpipe. 

On January 24, 2022, Karker was named to Canada's 2022 Olympic team. Karker would win the bronze medal in the women's halfpipe event.

Personal life
Karker was born in Guelph, Ontario, on September 9, 1997.

References

External links

1997 births
Living people
X Games athletes
Canadian female freestyle skiers
Sportspeople from Guelph
Freestyle skiers at the 2022 Winter Olympics
Olympic freestyle skiers of Canada
Olympic bronze medalists for Canada
Medalists at the 2022 Winter Olympics
Olympic medalists in freestyle skiing